In mathematics, a series is, roughly speaking, the operation of adding infinitely many quantities, one after the other, to a given starting quantity.  The study of series is a major part of calculus and its generalization, mathematical analysis. Series are used in most areas of mathematics, even for studying finite structures (such as in combinatorics) through generating functions. In addition to their ubiquity in mathematics, infinite series are also widely used in other quantitative disciplines such as physics, computer science, statistics and finance.

For a long time, the idea that such a potentially infinite summation could produce a finite result was considered paradoxical. This paradox was resolved using the concept of a limit during the 17th century. Zeno's paradox of Achilles and the tortoise illustrates this counterintuitive property of infinite sums: Achilles runs after a tortoise, but when he reaches the position of the tortoise at the beginning of the race, the tortoise has reached a second position; when he reaches this second position, the tortoise is at a third position, and so on. Zeno concluded that Achilles could never reach the tortoise, and thus that movement does not exist. Zeno divided the race into infinitely many sub-races, each requiring a finite amount of time, so that the total time for Achilles to catch the tortoise is given by a series. The resolution of the paradox is that, although the series has an infinite number of terms, it has a finite sum, which gives the time necessary for Achilles to catch up with the tortoise.

In modern terminology, any (ordered) infinite sequence  of terms (that is, numbers, functions, or anything that can be added) defines a series, which is the operation of adding the  one after the other. To emphasize that there are an infinite number of terms, a series may be called an infinite series. Such a series is represented (or denoted) by an expression like

or, using the summation sign,

The infinite sequence of additions implied by a series cannot be effectively carried on (at least in a finite amount of time). However, if the set to which the terms and their finite sums belong has a notion of limit, it is sometimes possible to assign a value to a series, called the sum of the series. This value is the limit as  tends to infinity (if the limit exists) of the finite sums of the  first terms of the series, which are called the th partial sums of the series. That is,

When this limit exists, one says that the series is convergent or summable, or that the sequence  is summable. In this case, the limit is called the sum of the series. Otherwise, the series is said to be divergent.

The notation  denotes both the series—that is the implicit process of adding the terms one after the other indefinitely—and, if the series is convergent, the sum of the series—the result of the process.

Generally, the terms of a series come from a ring, often the field  of the real numbers or the field  of the complex numbers. In this case, the set of all series is itself a ring (and even an associative algebra), in which the addition consists of adding the series term by term, and the multiplication is the Cauchy product.

Basic properties

An infinite series or simply a series is an infinite sum, represented by an infinite expression of the form

where  is any ordered sequence of terms, such as numbers, functions, or anything else that can be added (an abelian group).  This is an expression that is obtained from the list of terms  by laying them side by side, and conjoining them with the symbol "+".  A series may also be represented by using summation notation, such as

This includes the common cases from calculus, in which the group is the field of real numbers or the field of complex numbers. Given a series , its th partial sum is

By definition, the series  converges to the limit  (or simply sums to ), if the sequence of its partial sums has a limit . In this case, one usually writes

A series is said to be convergent if it converges to some limit, or divergent when it does not. The value of this limit, if it exists, is then the value of the series.

Convergent series

A series  is said to converge or to be convergent when the sequence  of partial sums has a finite limit. When the limit of partial sums exists, it is called the value (or sum) of the series

Such a series can be identified with a finite sum, so it is only infinite in a trivial sense.

Working out the properties of the series that converge, even if infinitely many terms are nonzero, is the essence of the study of series. Consider the example

It is possible to "visualize" its convergence on the real number line: we can imagine a line of length 2, with successive segments marked off of lengths 1, 1/2, 1/4, etc. There is always room to mark the next segment, because the amount of line remaining is always the same as the last segment marked: When we have marked off 1/2, we still have a piece of length 1/2 unmarked, so we can certainly mark the next 1/4. This argument does not prove that the sum is equal to 2 (although it is), but it does prove that it is at most 2.  In other words, the series has an upper bound. Given that the series converges, proving that it is equal to 2 requires only elementary algebra. If the series is denoted , it can be seen that

Therefore,

The idiom can be extended to other, equivalent notions of series. For instance, a recurring decimal, as in

encodes the series

Since these series always converge to real numbers (because of what is called the completeness property of the real numbers), to talk about the series in this way is the same as to talk about the numbers for which they stand. In particular, the decimal expansion 0.111... can be identified with 1/9. This leads to an argument that , which only relies on the fact that the limit laws for series preserve the arithmetic operations; for more detail on this argument, see 0.999....

Examples of numerical series

 A geometric series is one where each successive term is produced by multiplying the previous term by a constant number (called the common ratio in this context).
 The harmonic series is the series  The harmonic series is divergent.
 An alternating series is a series where terms alternate signs.  Examples:  (alternating harmonic series) and 
 A telescoping series  converges if the sequence bn converges to a limit L—as n goes to infinity. The value of the series is then b1 − L.
 An arithmetico-geometric series is a generalization of the geometric series, which has coefficients of the common ratio equal to the terms in an arithmetic sequence.  Example: 
 The p-series  converges if p > 1 and diverges for p ≤ 1, which can be shown with the integral criterion described below in convergence tests. As a function of p, the sum of this series is Riemann's zeta function.
 Hypergeometric series:  and their generalizations (such as basic hypergeometric series and elliptic hypergeometric series) frequently appear in integrable systems and mathematical physics.
 There are some elementary series whose convergence is not yet known/proven. For example, it is unknown whether the Flint Hills series   converges or not. The convergence depends on how well  can be approximated with rational numbers (which is unknown as of yet).

Pi

Natural logarithm of 2

Natural logarithm base e

Calculus and partial summation as an operation on sequences
Partial summation takes as input a sequence, (an), and gives as output another sequence, (SN). It is thus a unary operation on sequences. Further, this function is linear, and thus is a linear operator on the vector space of sequences, denoted Σ. The inverse operator is the finite difference operator, denoted Δ. These behave as discrete analogues of integration and differentiation, only for series (functions of a natural number) instead of functions of a real variable. For example, the sequence (1, 1, 1, ...) has series (1, 2, 3, 4, ...) as its partial summation, which is analogous to the fact that 

In computer science, it is known as prefix sum.

Properties of series
Series are classified not only by whether they converge or diverge, but also by the properties of the terms an (absolute or conditional convergence); type of convergence of the series (pointwise, uniform); the class of the term an (whether it is a real number, arithmetic progression, trigonometric function); etc.

Non-negative terms
When an is a non-negative real number for every n, the sequence SN of partial sums is non-decreasing. It follows that a series Σan with non-negative terms converges if and only if the sequence SN of partial sums is bounded.

For example, the series

is convergent, because the inequality

and a telescopic sum argument implies that the partial sums are bounded by 2. The exact value of the original series is the Basel problem.

Grouping
When you group a series reordering of the series does not happen, so Riemann series theorem does not apply. A new series will have its partial sums as subsequence of original series, which means if the original series converges, so does the new series. But for divergent series that is not true, for example 1-1+1-1+... grouped every two elements will create 0+0+0+... series, which is convergent. On the other hand, divergence of the new series means the original series can be only divergent which is sometimes useful, like in Oresme proof.

Absolute convergence

A series

converges absolutely if the series of absolute values

converges. This is sufficient to guarantee not only that the original series converges to a limit, but also that any reordering of it converges to the same limit.

Conditional convergence

A series of real or complex numbers is said to be conditionally convergent (or semi-convergent) if it is convergent but not absolutely convergent. A famous example is the alternating series

which is convergent (and its sum is equal to ), but the series formed by taking the absolute value of each term is the divergent harmonic series.

Abel's test is an important tool for handling semi-convergent series. If a series has the form

where the partial sums  are bounded,  has bounded variation, and  exists:

then the series  is convergent. This applies to the point-wise convergence of many trigonometric series, as in

Abel's method consists in writing , and in performing a transformation similar to integration by parts (called summation by parts), that relates the given series  to the absolutely convergent series

Evaluation of truncation errors
The evaluation of truncation errors is an important procedure in numerical analysis (especially validated numerics and computer-assisted proof).

Alternating series
Set  to be the partial sum  of the given alternating series . Then the next inequality holds:

Taylor series
Taylor's theorem is a statement that includes the evaluation of the error term when the Taylor series is truncated.

Hypergeometric series
By using the ratio, we can obtain the evaluation of the error term when the hypergeometric series is truncated.

Matrix exponential
For the matrix exponential:

the following error evaluation holds (scaling and squaring method):

Convergence tests

There exist many tests that can be used to determine whether particular series converge or diverge.
 n-th term test: If , then the series diverges; if , then the test is inconclusive.
 Comparison test 1 (see Direct comparison test): If  is an absolutely convergent series such that  for some number  and for sufficiently large , then  converges absolutely as well.
 Comparison test 2 (see Limit comparison test): If  is an absolutely convergent series such that  for sufficiently large , then  converges absolutely as well.
 Ratio test: If there exists a constant  such that  for all sufficiently large , then  converges absolutely.
 Root test: If there exists a constant  such that  for all sufficiently large , then  converges absolutely.
 Alternating series test: A series of the form  (with ) is called alternating. Such a series converges if the sequence  is monotone decreasing and converges to . The converse is in general not true.
 For some specific types of series there are more specialized convergence tests, for instance for Fourier series there is the Dini test.

Series of functions

A series of real- or complex-valued functions

converges pointwise on a set E, if the series converges for each x in E as an ordinary series of real or complex numbers.  Equivalently, the partial sums

converge to ƒ(x) as N → ∞ for each x ∈ E.

A stronger notion of convergence of a series of functions is the uniform convergence. A series converges uniformly if it converges pointwise to the function ƒ(x), and the error in approximating the limit by the Nth partial sum,

can be made minimal independently of x by choosing a sufficiently large N.

Uniform convergence is desirable for a series because many properties of the terms of the series are then retained by the limit.  For example, if a series of continuous functions converges uniformly, then the limit function is also continuous.  Similarly, if the ƒn are integrable on a closed and bounded interval I and converge uniformly, then the series is also integrable on I and can be integrated term-by-term. Tests for uniform convergence include the Weierstrass' M-test, Abel's uniform convergence test, Dini's test, and the Cauchy criterion.

More sophisticated types of convergence of a series of functions can also be defined.  In measure theory, for instance, a series of functions converges almost everywhere if it converges pointwise except on a certain set of measure zero.  Other modes of convergence depend on a different metric space structure on the space of functions under consideration.  For instance, a series of functions converges in mean on a set E to a limit function ƒ provided

as N → ∞.

Power series

A power series is a series of the form

The Taylor series at a point c of a function is a power series that, in many cases, converges to the function in a neighborhood of c. For example, the series

Unless it converges only at x=c, such a series converges on a certain open disc of convergence centered at the point c in the complex plane, and may also converge at some of the points of the boundary of the disc.  The radius of this disc is known as the radius of convergence, and can in principle be determined from the asymptotics of the coefficients an.  The convergence is uniform on closed and bounded (that is, compact) subsets of the interior of the disc of convergence: to wit, it is uniformly convergent on compact sets.

Historically, mathematicians such as Leonhard Euler operated liberally with infinite series, even if they were not convergent. When calculus was put on a sound and correct foundation in the nineteenth century, rigorous proofs of the convergence of series were always required.

Formal power series 

While many uses of power series refer to their sums, it is also possible to treat power series as formal sums, meaning that no addition operations are actually performed, and the symbol "+" is an abstract symbol of conjunction which is not necessarily interpreted as corresponding to addition. In this setting, the sequence of coefficients itself is of interest, rather than the convergence of the series. Formal power series are used in combinatorics to describe and study sequences that are otherwise difficult to handle, for example, using the method of generating functions.  The Hilbert–Poincaré series is a formal power series used to study graded algebras.

Even if the limit of the power series is not considered, if the terms support appropriate structure then it is possible to define operations such as addition, multiplication, derivative, antiderivative for power series "formally", treating the symbol "+" as if it corresponded to addition. In the most common setting, the terms come from a commutative ring, so that the formal power series can be added term-by-term and multiplied via the Cauchy product. In this case the algebra of formal power series is the total algebra of the monoid of natural numbers over the underlying term ring.  If the underlying term ring is a differential algebra, then the algebra of formal power series is also a differential algebra, with differentiation performed term-by-term.

Laurent series

Laurent series generalize power series by admitting terms into the series with negative as well as positive exponents.  A Laurent series is thus any series of the form

If such a series converges, then in general it does so in an annulus rather than a disc, and possibly some boundary points.  The series converges uniformly on compact subsets of the interior of the annulus of convergence.

Dirichlet series

A Dirichlet series is one of the form

where s is a complex number.  For example, if all an are equal to 1, then the Dirichlet series is the Riemann zeta function

Like the zeta function, Dirichlet series in general play an important role in analytic number theory. Generally a Dirichlet series converges if the real part of s is greater than a number called the abscissa of convergence. In many cases, a Dirichlet series can be extended to an analytic function outside the domain of convergence by analytic continuation.

This series can be directly generalized to general Dirichlet series.

Trigonometric series

A series of functions in which the terms are trigonometric functions is called a trigonometric series:

The most important example of a trigonometric series is the Fourier series of a function.

History of the theory of infinite series

Development of infinite series
Greek mathematician Archimedes produced the first known summation of an infinite series with a
method that is still used in the area of calculus today. He used the method of exhaustion to calculate the area under the arc of a parabola with the summation of an infinite series, and gave a remarkably accurate approximation of π.

Mathematicians from Kerala, India studied infinite series around 1350 CE.

In the 17th century, James Gregory worked in the new decimal system on infinite series and published several Maclaurin series. In 1715, a general method for constructing the Taylor series for all functions for which they exist was provided by Brook Taylor. Leonhard Euler in the 18th century, developed the theory of hypergeometric series and q-series.

Convergence criteria
The investigation of the validity of infinite series is considered to begin with Gauss in the 19th century. Euler had already considered the hypergeometric series

on which Gauss published a memoir in 1812. It established simpler criteria of convergence, and the questions of remainders and the range of convergence.

Cauchy (1821) insisted on strict tests of convergence; he showed that if two series are convergent their product is not necessarily so, and with him begins the discovery of effective criteria. The terms convergence and divergence had been introduced long before by Gregory (1668). Leonhard Euler and Gauss had given various criteria, and Colin Maclaurin had anticipated some of Cauchy's discoveries. Cauchy advanced the theory of power series by his expansion of a complex function in such a form.

Abel (1826) in his memoir on the binomial series

He showed the necessity of considering the subject of continuity in questions of convergence.

Cauchy's methods led to special rather than general criteria, and
the same may be said of Raabe (1832), who made the first elaborate investigation of the subject, of De Morgan (from 1842), whose
logarithmic test DuBois-Reymond (1873) and Pringsheim (1889) have
shown to fail within a certain region; of Bertrand (1842), Bonnet
(1843), Malmsten (1846, 1847, the latter without integration); Stokes (1847), Paucker (1852), Chebyshev (1852), and Arndt
(1853).

General criteria began with Kummer (1835), and have been studied by Eisenstein (1847), Weierstrass in his various
contributions to the theory of functions, Dini (1867),
DuBois-Reymond (1873), and many others. Pringsheim's memoirs (1889) present the most complete general theory.

Uniform convergence
The theory of uniform convergence was treated by Cauchy (1821), his limitations being pointed out by Abel, but the first to attack it
successfully were Seidel and Stokes (1847–48). Cauchy took up the
problem again (1853), acknowledging Abel's criticism, and reaching
the same conclusions which Stokes had already found. Thomae used the
doctrine (1866), but there was great delay in recognizing the importance of distinguishing between uniform and non-uniform
convergence, in spite of the demands of the theory of functions.

Semi-convergence
A series is said to be semi-convergent (or conditionally convergent) if it is convergent but not absolutely convergent.

Semi-convergent series were studied by Poisson (1823), who also gave a general form for the remainder of the Maclaurin formula. The most important solution of the problem is due, however, to Jacobi (1834), who attacked the question of the remainder from a different standpoint and reached a different formula. This expression was also worked out, and another one given, by Malmsten (1847). Schlömilch (Zeitschrift, Vol.I, p. 192, 1856) also improved Jacobi's remainder, and showed the relation between the remainder and Bernoulli's function

Genocchi (1852) has further contributed to the theory.

Among the early writers was Wronski, whose "loi suprême" (1815) was hardly recognized until Cayley (1873) brought it into
prominence.

Fourier series
Fourier series were being investigated
as the result of physical considerations at the same time that
Gauss, Abel, and Cauchy were working out the theory of infinite
series. Series for the expansion of sines and cosines, of multiple
arcs in powers of the sine and cosine of the arc had been treated by
Jacob Bernoulli (1702) and his brother Johann Bernoulli (1701) and still
earlier by Vieta. Euler and Lagrange simplified the subject,
as did Poinsot, Schröter, Glaisher, and Kummer.

Fourier (1807) set for himself a different problem, to
expand a given function of x in terms of the sines or cosines of
multiples of x, a problem which he embodied in his Théorie analytique de la chaleur (1822). Euler had already given the formulas for determining the coefficients in the series;
Fourier was the first to assert and attempt to prove the general
theorem. Poisson (1820–23) also attacked the problem from a
different standpoint. Fourier did not, however, settle the question
of convergence of his series, a matter left for Cauchy (1826) to
attempt and for Dirichlet (1829) to handle in a thoroughly
scientific manner (see convergence of Fourier series). Dirichlet's treatment (Crelle, 1829), of trigonometric series was the subject of criticism and improvement by
Riemann (1854), Heine, Lipschitz, Schläfli, and
du Bois-Reymond. Among other prominent contributors to the theory of
trigonometric and Fourier series were Dini, Hermite, Halphen,
Krause, Byerly and Appell.

Generalizations

Asymptotic series 

Asymptotic series, otherwise asymptotic expansions, are infinite series whose partial sums become good approximations in the limit of some point of the domain.  In general they do not converge, but they are useful as sequences of approximations, each of which provides a value close to the desired answer for a finite number of terms. The difference is that an asymptotic series cannot be made to produce an answer as exact as desired, the way that convergent series can. In fact, after a certain number of terms, a typical asymptotic series reaches its best approximation; if more terms are included, most such series will produce worse answers.

Divergent series 

Under many circumstances, it is desirable to assign a limit to a series which fails to converge in the usual sense.  A summability method is such an assignment of a limit to a subset of the set of divergent series which properly extends the classical notion of convergence.  Summability methods include Cesàro summation, (C,k) summation, Abel summation, and Borel summation, in increasing order of generality (and hence applicable to increasingly divergent series).

A variety of general results concerning possible summability methods are known.  The Silverman–Toeplitz theorem characterizes matrix summability methods, which are methods for summing a divergent series by applying an infinite matrix to the vector of coefficients.  The most general method for summing a divergent series is non-constructive, and concerns Banach limits.

Summations over arbitrary index sets 

Definitions may be given for sums over an arbitrary index set   There are two main differences with the usual notion of series: first, there is no specific order given on the set ; second, this set  may be uncountable.  The notion of convergence needs to be strengthened, because the concept of conditional convergence depends on the ordering of the index set.

Thus, we obtain the common notation for a series indexed by the natural numbers

Families of non-negative numbers 

When summing a family  of non-negative real numbers, define

When the supremum is finite then the set of  such that  is countable.  Indeed, for every  the cardinality  of the set  is finite because

If  is countably infinite and enumerated as  then the above defined sum satisfies

provided the value  is allowed for the sum of the series.

Any sum over non-negative reals can be understood as the integral of a non-negative function with respect to the counting measure, which accounts for the many similarities between the two constructions.

Abelian topological groups 

Saying that the sum  is the limit of finite partial sums means that for every neighborhood  of the origin in  there exists a finite subset  of  such that

Because  is not totally ordered, this is not a limit of a sequence of partial sums, but rather of a net.

which implies that  for every  (by taking  and ). 

When  is complete, a family  is unconditionally summable in  if and only if the finite sums satisfy the latter Cauchy net condition.

When the sum of a family of non-negative numbers, in the extended sense defined before, is finite, then it coincides with the sum in the topological group 

This need not be true in a general abelian topological group (see examples below).

Unconditionally convergent series 

Suppose that   If a family  is unconditionally summable in a Hausdorff abelian topological group  then the series in the usual sense converges and has the same sum,

By nature, the definition of unconditional summability is insensitive to the order of the summation.  When  is unconditionally summable, then the series remains convergent after any permutation  of the set  of indices, with the same sum,

Conversely, if every permutation of a series  converges, then the series is unconditionally convergent.  When  is complete then unconditional convergence is also equivalent to the fact that all subseries are convergent; if  is a Banach space, this is equivalent to say that for every sequence of signs , the series

converges in

Series in topological vector spaces 

It is called absolutely summable if in addition, for every continuous seminorm  on  the family  is summable.
If  is a normable space and if  is an absolutely summable family in  then necessarily all but a countable collection of ’s are zero. Hence, in normed spaces, it is usually only ever necessary to consider series with countably many terms.

Summable families play an important role in the theory of nuclear spaces.

Series in Banach and seminormed spaces 

The notion of series can be easily extended to the case of a seminormed space. 

More generally, convergence of series can be defined in any abelian Hausdorff topological group. 
Specifically, in this case,  converges to  if the sequence of partial sums converges to 

If  is a seminormed space, then the notion of absolute convergence becomes: 
A series  of vectors in  converges absolutely if

in which case all but at most countably many of the values  are necessarily zero.

If a countable series of vectors in a Banach space converges absolutely then it converges unconditionally, but the converse only holds in finite-dimensional Banach spaces (theorem of ).

Well-ordered sums 

Conditionally convergent series can be considered if  is a well-ordered set, for example, an ordinal number 
In this case, define by transfinite recursion:

and for a limit ordinal 

if this limit exists.  If all limits exist up to  then the series converges.

Examples 

 Given a function  into an abelian topological group  define for every   a function whose support is a singleton   Then  in the topology of pointwise convergence (that is, the sum is taken in the infinite product group ).
 In the definition of partitions of unity, one constructs sums of functions over arbitrary index set   While, formally, this requires a notion of sums of uncountable series, by construction there are, for every given  only finitely many nonzero terms in the sum, so issues regarding convergence of such sums do not arise. Any regularity property of the  such as continuity, differentiability, that is preserved under finite sums will be preserved for the sum of any subcollection of this family of functions.
 On the first uncountable ordinal  viewed as a topological space in the order topology, the constant function  given by  satisfies  (in other words,  copies of 1 is ) only if one takes a limit over all countable partial sums, rather than finite partial sums.  This space is not separable.

See also
 Continued fraction
 Convergence tests
 Convergent series
 Divergent series
 Infinite compositions of analytic functions
 Infinite expression
 Infinite product
 Iterated binary operation
 List of mathematical series
 Prefix sum
 Sequence transformation
 Series expansion

References

Bibliography

Bromwich, T. J. An Introduction to the Theory of Infinite Series MacMillan & Co. 1908, revised 1926, reprinted 1939, 1942, 1949, 1955, 1959, 1965.
 
  
 
 Walter Rudin, Principles of Mathematical Analysis (McGraw-Hill: New York, 1964).

External links

 
 Infinite Series Tutorial
 
 

Calculus